The Battle of West Suiyuan was part of the
Second Sino-Japanese War. It was fought from January – February 1940, as part of the Chinese 1939 Winter Offensive.

Battle 
In 1937 the Chinese government picked up intelligence that the Japanese planned a puppet Hui Muslim country around Suiyuan and Ningxia, and had sent agents to the region.

The Middlesboro Daily News ran an article by Owen Lattimore which reported on Japan's planned offensive into the Muslim region in 1938, which predicted that the Japanese would suffer a massive crushing defeat at the hands of the Muslims.

The Japanese  planned to invade Ningxia from Suiyuan in 1939 and create a Hui Muslim puppet state. The following year in 1940, the Japanese were defeated militarily by the Kuomintang Muslim General Ma Hongbin, who caused the plan to collapse. Ma Hongbin's Hui Muslim troops launched further attacks against Japan in the Battle of West Suiyuan.

In Suiyuan 300 Mongol collaborators serving the Japanese were fought off by a single Muslim who held the rank of Major at the Battle of Wulan Obo in 1939 April.

Muslim Generals Ma Hongkui and Ma Hongbin defended west Suiyuan, particularly Wuyuan in 1940 against the Japanese. Ma Hongbin commanded the 81st corps and sustained heavy casualties, but eventually repulsed the Japanese and defeated them.

Japan used poison gas against Chinese Muslim armies at the Battle of Wuyuan and Battle of West Suiyuan.

References 

West Suiyuan
Battles involving Mengjiang
1940 in China
January 1940 events
February 1940 events